Tofig Gasimov Masim oglu (10 April 1938 – 29 January 2020) was an Azerbaijani politician and diplomat.

Early life
Gasimov was born in Leki village of Agdash Rayon, Azerbaijan. In 1945–1955, he studied in Agstafa city school. In 1955–1960, he was enrolled at Azerbaijan State University and graduated with a degree in Physics and Mathematics using Stalin scholarship. After graduation, he worked at the Physics Institute of Azerbaijan National Academy of Sciences. Gasimov continued with his post graduate studies at Physics Institute of USSR Academy of Sciences and in 1969, he obtained his PhD degree. He then worked as scientist at the National Academy of Sciences in Baku from 1970 on.

Political career
Since 1987, Gasimov was involved in politics. In March–May 1988, Gasimov participated in drafting the charter of Popular Front of Azerbaijan (PFA) and was one of board members of the organization from 1989 to 1990. He was elected member of the Investigation Committee of Azerbaijani Supreme Soviet during the extraordinary session of the parliament on 22 January 1990 to investigate Black January massacre of 20 January 1990. On behalf of PFA, Gasimov had been sent to Moscow to cooperate with deputies of Azerbaijan SSR. Gasimov was credited for his role disseminating the truth about the Black January, refugees to more than 100 TV, radio channels as well as to international media. In May 1992, he was appointed the Minister of Foreign Affairs of Azerbaijan and served until April 1993. Gasimov played an important role in establishing ties with other countries while in office. During his term, Gasimov signed MOU with UN representatives that led to establishment of Azerbaijan's permanent mission to United Nations. After being removed from his post, Gasimov tried to get elected to Azerbaijani Parliament as a member of Musavat during the November 1995 parliament elections but was jailed before the elections even took place.

Post political career
Gasimov authored nearly 100 scientific publications. Tofig Gasimov was the co-founder of Baku Scientists Club. Since the end of the 1990s, he taught in various universities in Turkey and continued his scientific research work.

He was married and had 2 children. Gasimov was fluent in English, Russian and Turkish.

References

1938 births
2020 deaths
Prime Ministers of Azerbaijan
Azerbaijani diplomats
Ministers of Foreign Affairs of Azerbaijan
Azerbaijani Popular Front Party politicians
Baku State University alumni